Thomas W. Clarkson is a heavy metals toxicologist and an emeritus professor in the department of environmental medicine at the University of Rochester Medical Center. His area of expertise is mercury, and he has been involved in the Seychelles Child Development Study. After Karen Wetterhahn's death, Clarkson's lab analyzed the dimethylmercury levels that had been responsible for her death.

Education
Clarkson has a bachelor's degree in chemistry (1953) and a PhD in biochemistry from the University of Manchester (1956).

Selected publications

References

University of Rochester faculty
American toxicologists
Living people
Alumni of the University of Manchester
Year of birth missing (living people)
Place of birth missing (living people)
Members of the National Academy of Medicine